The Salzgitter Hills (also Salzgitterscher Höhenzug) is an area of upland up to  in height, in the Lower Saxon Hills between Salzgitter and Goslar in the districts of Wolfenbüttel and Goslar and in the territory of the independent town of Salzgitter. The hills lie in the German federal state of Lower Saxony.

The Salzgitter Hills can be divided into these four unnamed sections:
 Northwest section (mainly comprising the Lichtenberge)(up to 254.2 m high; between Holle and Salzgitter-Gebhardshagen)
 North-central section(up to 275.3 m high; between Salzgitter-Gebhardshagen and Salzgitter-Bad)
 South-central section(up to 307.0 m high; between Salzgitter-Bad and Liebenburg)
 Southern section(up to 322.9 m high; between Liebenburg and Goslar-Immenrode and Goslar-Hahndorf)

Hills 
The hills of the Salzgitter range include (in order of height in m above NN):

Northwest section 
Lichtenberge:

 Adlershorst (254.2 m)
 Burgberg (241.1 m) – with the ruins of Lichtenberg Castle
 Herzberg (237 m)
 Langer Berg (230.4 m)
 Kalkrosenberg (220 m)
 Lindenberg (219.2 m)
 Friesenberg (217 m)
 Steinkuhlenberge (200.9 m and 195.1 m)
 Bockernberg (190 m)

South of the Lichtenberge and also in the northwest section is a ridge that is separated from them by the valley of the  Oelber Bach, in which the village of Oelber on white hills and the settlement of Altenhagen lies. It consists of the following:
 Sieben Köpfe (243 m; bei Gustedt; eastern part)
 Gustedter Berg (ca. 230 m; central part)
 Elber Berg (225 m; western part)

North-central section 

 Hamberg (275.3 m) – with the Bismarck Tower
 Dahlenberg (263.8 m; west of Haus Harbeck)
 Knickeln Berg (263.6 m; south of Dahlenberg)
 Schellenberg (259.9 m; north of Haus Harbeck)
 Königsberg (241.9 m; near Calbecht)
 Großer Vorberg (ca. 235 m)
 Kleiner Vorberg (228.1 m)
 Vorberg (226.0 m)
 Heinemannshöhe (222.2 m)
 Friesenberg (217 m)
 Schneidlersberg (198.0 m and 192.3 m; east of the L472)
 Fuchsberg (192.3 m; east of the L472)

South-central section 

 Sieben Köpfe (near Othfresen; their highest is):
 Bärenkopf (307.0 m) – with the ruins of an observation tower
 Döhrenberg (ca. 240 m)
 Rohenberg (ca. 240 m)
 Lewer Berg (227.0 m)
 Kassebusch (204.2 m)

Southern section 

 Vier Berge (322.9 m)
 Fischerköpfe (309.1 m)
 Querberg (303.4 m)
 Königsberg (293.9 m; near Weddingen)
 Meseburg (291.0 m)
 Barley (288.4 m)
 Langenberg (287.3 m)
 Glockenberg (284.4 m)
 Schneeberg (282.6 m)
 Försterberg (279.2 m)
 Frankenberg (269.2 m)
 Grotenberg (256.1 m)

Bodies of water

Streams and rivers 
The streams and rivers in and on the Salzgitter Hills include the:

 Fuhse – passes to the east of the northern central and northwestern sections
 Hengstebach – rises west of the northern central section in der municipality of Elbe; eastern tributary of the Innerste
 Innerste – passes the hills to the west
 Oker – passes east of the southern section
 Warne – rises on the transition from the northern to the southern central section near Salzgitter-Bad; western tributary of the Oker

Lakes 
The lakes in and around the Salzgitter Hills include the:

 Reihersee – in the north of the northern central section; south of Salzgitter-Gebhardshagen
 Fortunateich – in the north of the southern section; east of Liebenburg-Heißum
 Morgensternteich – in the south of the southern section; northeast of Goslar-Hahndorf

Settlements 

Amongst the (generally larger) villages and towns in and around the Salzgitter Hills (from northwest to southeast) are:

 Holle – a few kilometres west of the western end of the northwest section (Landkreis Hildesheim)
 Baddeckenstedt – southwest of northwest section (Landkreis Wolfenbüttel)
 Wartjenstedt – west of the western end of the northwest section
 Burgdorf (municipality of Baddeckenstedt) – northwest of the northwest section
 Elbe (municipality of Baddeckenstedt) – south of the northwest section
 Haverlah (municipality of Baddeckenstedt) – southwest of northern central section
 Salzgitter – in the northern parts of the northwest section and the northern central section (kreisfreie Stadt)
 Osterlinde – north of the northwest section
 Lichtenberg – north of the northwest section
 Gebhardshagen – on the transition of the northwestern section to the northern central section
 Bad – on the transition from the northern to the southern central section
 Ringelheim – west of the transition from the northern to the southern central section
 Liebenburg – on the transition from the northern to the southern central section (Landkreis Goslar)
 Dörnten – west of the southern section
 Groß Döhren – east of the southern section
 Othfresen – south of the southern central section
 Vienenburg – a few kilometres east of the southern section (Landkreis Goslar)
 Immenrode (western village of Vienenburg) – southeast of the southern section
 Weddingen – southeast of the southern section
 Goslar – south of the extreme southern end of the southern section (Landkreis Goslar)
 Hahndorf (northern village of Goslar) – south of the southern section
 Jerstedt (northwestern village of Goslar) – southwest of southern section

Sources 

 Bundesanstalt für Landeskunde and Raumforschung: Geographische Landesaufnahme 1:200000. Naturräumliche Gliederung Deutschlands. Die naturräumlichen Einheiten auf Blatt 86 Hannover. Bad Godesberg 1960

External links 
 Landschaftsschutzgebiet im Landkreis Goslar (PDF-Datei; 2,56 MB)
 Aktiver Naturschutz im Salzgitter-Höhenzug

References 

Forests and woodlands of Lower Saxony
Hill ranges of Lower Saxony
Natural regions of the Weser-Leine Uplands